There have been a number of Royal Navy ships called HMS Brazen

 was a cutter purchased in 1781 and sold on 9 April 1799 for £340.
 was the French privateer L'Invincible General Bonaparte, taken in 1798; Brazen was wrecked in January 1800 near Newhaven.
 was a sixth-rate 28-gun sloop, launched in 1808 and broken up in 1848.
 was the lead ship of the s, a C-class destroyer built at the end of the 19th century.
 was a Type 22 frigate sold to the Brazilian Navy in 1994, which renamed her Bosisio. She was expended as a target in 2017.

Battle Honours
Norway 1940
English Channel 1940
Kuwait 1991

Royal Navy ship names